The Compulsory Husband is a 1930 British comedy film directed by Monty Banks and Harry Lachman and starring Banks, Lillian Manton and Clifford Heatherley. It was based on a novel by John Glyder.

Cast
 Monty Banks as Monty
 Lillian Manton as Joy
 Clifford Heatherley as Mr Pilluski
 Gladys Frazin as Mrs Pilluski
 Trilby Clark as Gilda
 Reginald Fox as Father
 Janet Alexander as Mother
 Michael Powell as Man

References

Bibliography
Low, Rachael. Filmmaking in 1930s Britain. George Allen & Unwin, 1985.
Wood, Linda. British Films, 1927–1939. British Film Institute, 1986.

External links

1930 films
British comedy films
1930 comedy films
Films shot at British International Pictures Studios
1930s English-language films
Films directed by Monty Banks
Films directed by Harry Lachman
Films based on British novels
British black-and-white films
1930s British films